is a Japanese footballer currently playing as a defender for Mito HollyHock.

Club career
In September 2021, Matsuda was announced as a designated special player for J2 League side Mito HollyHock.

International career
In April 2022, Matsuda was called up to the Japan national under-19 football team for the first time.

Career statistics

Club
.

Notes

References

2003 births
Living people
Association football people from Hokkaido
Japanese footballers
Japan youth international footballers
Association football defenders
J2 League players
Mito HollyHock players